Brock McPherson (born July 24, 1985) is a Canadian former professional ice hockey right winger. He played for the Braehead Clan and the Dundee Stars in the Elite Ice Hockey League in the United Kingdom between 2011 and 2014. McPherson had previously played junior hockey in the Ontario Hockey League for the Brampton Battalion and the Belleville Bulls and then spent six years at Lakehead University before signing his first professional contract with Braehead in 2011.

External links

1985 births
Living people
Belleville Bulls players
Dundee Stars players
Braehead Clan players
Brampton Battalion players
Canadian ice hockey right wingers
Ice hockey people from Toronto
Canadian expatriate ice hockey players in Scotland
Lakehead University alumni